The Salvadorian records in swimming are the fastest ever performances of swimmers from El Salvador, which are recognized and ratified by the Federación Salvadoreña de Natación.

All records were set in finals unless noted otherwise.

Long Course (50 m)

Men

Women

Mixed relay

Short Course (25 m)

Men

Women

Mixed relay

References

External links
  Federación Salvadoreña de Natación official website
  Salvadorian records

Salvador
Records
Swimming
Swimming